Teamline Air Luftfahrt GesmbH was an airline based in Austria, which was operational from 2001 to 2004. The airline was a sub-company of Fairline Flugbetriebs GmbH, which ceased to exist in 2006.

References

Defunct airlines of Austria
Airlines established in 2001
Airlines disestablished in 2004
2001 establishments in Austria
2004 disestablishments in Austria